Ardennes and Eifel are mountain ranges in Europe that form part of the same volcanic field and also of the Rhenish Massif. These are mountains and hills composed of slate and limestone, and of an average altitude of 400 to 500 meters, with several summits reaching the 700 meters.

These mountain ranges are situated in western Europe. Their western starting point roughly begins where the Meuse river crosses the French-Belgian border. They stretch in a northeastern direction, covering eastern Belgium (Wallonia), northern Luxembourg and western Germany as far as the Rhine river between the cities of Bonn and Koblenz, and are bordered by the Moselle river on the south.

The very eastern part of Belgium (Belgian Eifel) and also the north of Luxembourg (Oesling) form a transitional area between the Ardennes on the left (French speaking) and the Eifel on the right (German speaking).

Ardennes and Eifel are thinly populated, abundant with forests, wildlife, and rivers carving deep valleys.

See also 
 Ardennes
 Eifel

Maps

Photos 

 
Mountain ranges of Europe